The 2021 season of the Knock on Effect New South Wales Cup was curtailed due to lockdowns introduced to combat the Delta variant of the COVID-19 pandemic in New South Wales. Fifteen of a scheduled 24 rounds were played, with the last completed round of matches occurring on the weekend of 19-20 June, 2021.

Knock on Effect New South Wales Cup

Teams 
There were 11 teams in 2021.

Ladder 
The table below reflects the competition ladder at the completion of Round 15. This was the last completed round played, and occurred on the weekend of the 19-20 June, 2021. During July and early August 2021, when there was a hope that the competition could be resumed in late August and September, scheduled matches were cancelled, with the result recorded as a nil-all draw. A Round 2 match between Blacktown Workers Sea Eagles and South Sydney Rabbitohs was postponed due to wet weather. As the re-scheduled date was 28 July, 2021 this match was not played.

Ladder progression 

 Numbers highlighted in green indicate that the team finished the round inside the top 8.
 Numbers highlighted in blue indicates the team finished first on the ladder in that round.
 Numbers highlighted in red indicates the team finished last place on the ladder in that round.
Underlined numbers indicate that the team had a bye during that round.

Season results

Round 1

Round 2

Round 3

Round 4

Round 5

Round 6

Round 7

Round 8

Round 9

Round 10

Round 11

Round 12

Round 13

Round 14

Round 15

Round 16

Round 17

Round 18

Round 19

Round 20

Round 21

Round 22

Round 23

Round 24

Finals series

References

2021 in Australian rugby league
Rugby league in New South Wales
Rugby league competitions in New South Wales